The 1919 USC Trojans football team represented the University of Southern California (USC) in the 1919 college football season. In their first year under head coach Gus Henderson, the Trojans compiled a 4–1 record and outscored their opponents by a combined total of 87 to 21.

Schedule

References

USC Trojans
USC Trojans football seasons
USC Trojans football